The Texas A&M Aggies football program is a college football team that represents Texas A&M University in the Western Division of the Southeastern Conference (SEC) in the National Collegiate Athletic Association (NCAA). The team has had 27 head coaches since it started playing organized football in 1894. Texas A&M University was a charter member of the Southwest Conference, joining in 1915, while then known as the Agricultural and Mechanical College of Texas or Texas A.M.C. Texas A&M became a charter member of the Big 12 in 1996 when the Southwest Conference disbanded. The Aggies subsequently left the Big 12 following the 2011 season and joined as the 13th member of the SEC effective for the 2012 season. The team nickname is the Aggies, a reference to the agricultural roots of the university. The Aggies have played in 1,244 games during their 122 completed  seasons. In those seasons, twelve coaches have led Texas A&M to postseason bowl games: Dana X. Bible, Homer H. Norton, Robert Harry Stiteler, Bear Bryant, Gene Stallings, Emory Bellard, Tom Wilson, Jackie Sherrill, R. C. Slocum, Dennis Franchione, Mike Sherman, and Kevin Sumlin.  Seven coaches have won conference championships with the Aggies: Bible, Norton, Bryant, Stallings, Bellard, Sherrill and Slocum. Bible and Norton are the only coaches to have won a national championship at Texas A&M.

Slocum is the all-time leader in games coached (172), total wins (123) and is tied with Norton for years coached (14). D. V. Graves has the highest winning percentage of any Aggies coach with a 6–1 record (.857) in his only year. Of coaches who served more than one season, Walter E. Bachman leads with a .813 winning percentage. Henry Foldberg is, in terms of winning percentage, the worst coach the Aggies have had (.217). Of the 27 Aggie coaches, six have been inducted in the College Football Hall of Fame: Bible, Madison Bell, Norton, Bryant, Stallings and Slocum. Slocum and Sumlin are the only coaches to have received any coach of the year accolades, with Slocum winning the Southwest Conference Coach of the Year award three years in a row, and Sumlin winning SEC Coach of the Year in 2012.

Key

Coaches

Notes

References
General

Specific

Texas AandM

Texas A&M Aggies football